Roland Van De Rijse (born 2 August 1942) is a former Belgian cyclist. He competed in the team time trial and the team pursuit events at the 1964 Summer Olympics.

References

1942 births
Living people
Belgian male cyclists
Cyclists at the 1964 Summer Olympics
Olympic cyclists of Belgium
People from Beernem
Sportspeople from West Flanders